RFA Reliant (A131) was a helicopter support ship of the Royal Fleet Auxiliary. 
She was built in 1977 in Poland, at the Gdańsk Shipyard, as a conventional container ship with roll-on/roll-off capability for loading vehicles and containers for the Harrison Line. She was named Astronomer. She was taken up from the trade in 1982 for service in the Falklands War as an aircraft transport, being fitted with a temporary mid-ships flight deck and hangar forward to carry 13 helicopters.

At the end of 1982 she was chartered by the UK MoD and a more substantial conversion was undertaken, and was fitted with the Arapaho containerized aircraft handling system, a hangar and a flight deck and she was commissioned into the RFA Fleet as RFA Reliant. Her first operational sortie was to the coast of Lebanon in support of the Multinational Force in Lebanon and the British Army units based in Beirut, eventually evacuating the same in February 1984. Upon returning to UK she proceeded to the Falklands for what was expected to be an extended deployment. However, it did not last long as the Arapaho system proved to be unsatisfactory for handling aircraft. She was decommissioned in 1986 and sold back into conventional merchant service.

References

Ships of the Royal Fleet Auxiliary
1976 ships